Nachman Castro (born 23 January 1948) is an Israeli former footballer. He competed in the men's tournament at the 1968 Summer Olympics.

References

External links
 
 

1948 births
Living people
Israeli footballers
Israel international footballers
Olympic footballers of Israel
Footballers at the 1968 Summer Olympics
Footballers from İzmir
Association football forwards
Hapoel Tel Aviv F.C. players
Smyrniote Jews
Turkish emigrants to Israel